Dracontogena is a genus of moths belonging to the subfamily Olethreutinae of the family Tortricidae.

Species
Dracontogena bernardi Karisch, 2005
Dracontogena hoppei Karisch, 2005
Dracontogena lucki Karisch, 2005
Dracontogena metamorphica (Meyrick, 1928)
Dracontogena niphadonta Diakonoff, 1970
Dracontogena schnirchi Karisch, 2005
Dracontogena tonitrualis (Meyrick, 1934)

See also
List of Tortricidae genera

References

External links
tortricidae.com

Tortricidae genera
Olethreutinae
Taxa named by Alexey Diakonoff